Johann Georg Christian, Prince of Lobkowitz (10 August 1686 – 4 October 1755), was an Austrian Generalfeldmarschall (field marshal). He was a member of the old Bohemian noble family of Lobkowicz, of which family he established a cadet branch, the Hořín-Mělník line.

Life
He was born in Prague to Ferdinand August Leopold, 3rd Prince of Lobkowicz and Duke of Sagan, and his second wife, Marie Anna Wilhelmine von Baden-Baden and Hochberg. In his adult age he fought under Prince Eugene of Savoy against the French in the War of the Spanish Succession and later against the Turks during the Austro-Turkish War of 1716–1718. He succeeded Piccolomini after his death in Prishtina, Kosovo, but Johann increased taxes and failed to maintaining good relations and the Albanian and Serb forces went joined the Ottomans.

Since 1717 he commanded his own cuirassier regiment. In 1732 became Governor of Sicily (the island was for a short time a part of Habsburg realm). On 28 November 1739 he was made a Knight in the Order of the Golden Fleece. In 1741 he attained the rank of field marshal.

During the War of the Austrian Succession, he fought successfully the French (under the command of Maréchal de Belle-Isle) and Bavarians between Prague and Munich; through the actions of his troops he managed to close and besiege de Belle-Isle men in Prague. Later, he was appointed as the Governor of the Duchy of Milan (1743–45). Subsequently, he became the commander-in-chief of the Habsburg forces in Italy, where he lost the Battle of Velletri (1744) against the army of King Charles III of Spain.

In 1745 composer Christoph Willibald Gluck accepted an invitation to become house composer at London's King's Theatre, travelling to England, possibly in the company of Georg Christian but more likely with his younger cousin, Ferdinand Philipp, 6th Prince Lobkowitz.

Family 
Johann Georg Christian married Countess Henriette von Waldstein-Wartenburg in Prague on 11 March 1717. They had 10 children. Two of their sons were killed in battle; two other sons, Joseph Maria Karl and August Joseph Anton, served in the Austrian military and diplomatic corps and became Knights in the Order of the Golden Fleece and one, Ferdinand Maria von Lobkowicz, became bishop of Ghent.

See also
 Angelo Soliman

Notes

References
 

1686 births
1755 deaths
Austrian princes
Field marshals of Austria
Bohemian nobility
Austrian military personnel of the War of the Austrian Succession
Lobkowicz family
Generals of the Holy Roman Empire
Knights of the Golden Fleece of Austria